Matthew Ryan Polster (born June 8, 1993) is an American professional soccer player who plays as a defensive midfielder for Major League Soccer club New England Revolution.

Career

Early career

Born in Milwaukee, Wisconsin, but raised in Las Vegas, Nevada, Polster played his youth soccer at Downtown Las Vegas Soccer Club.  He attended Southern Illinois University Edwardsville where he played for the SIU Edwardsville Cougars. While with the university, Polster earned many honors including 2014 NSCAA All-West Region First Team selection and 2014 NSCAA Scholar All-America First Team selection.

Chicago Fire
On January 15, 2015, Polster was selected as the 7th overall pick by the Chicago Fire during the 2015 MLS SuperDraft and was signed to a contract on February 4. During his rookie season for the Fire, Polster has played an important role as a holding midfielder, drawing praise from league commentators for his precise passing and defensive capabilities, he earned recognition as Soccer by Ives 'Rookie of the Week' on three occasions during the 2015 season. On July 31, 2016, Polster scored his first career MLS goal in a 2–2 draw against the New York Red Bulls. The goal would later be voted as the Chicago Fire goal of the season in at the end of the year. Polster missed the majority of the 2018 Major League Soccer season due to an MCL injury, causing him to only appear in three matches.

Rangers
In December 2018, Polster had a trial with Scottish Premiership team Rangers. On January 30, 2019, Polster signed a -year contract with Scottish Premiership club Rangers. Polster made his first appearance in a continental tournament against Gibraltarian club, St Joseph's F.C. in the 2019–20 UEFA Europa League qualifying round.

New England Revolution
On July 8, 2020, Polster returned to the United States and signed with the New England Revolution. In order to sign Polster, the Revolution had to trade $100,000 in General Allocation Money to his former club Chicago Fire for his rights.

International career
In January 2016, Polster received his first call up to the senior United States squad for friendlies against Iceland and Canada. Polster did not appear in any of the two matches. Two years later, he was called into January camp again for a friendly against Bosnia and Herzegovina, making his debut in the 0–0 draw.

Career statistics

References

External links 

 

1993 births
Living people
American soccer players
American expatriate soccer players
SIU Edwardsville Cougars men's soccer players
Victoria Highlanders players
Chicago Fire U-23 players
Chicago Fire FC players
Rangers F.C. players
New England Revolution players
Scottish Professional Football League players
Association football defenders
Soccer players from Milwaukee
Soccer players from Las Vegas
Expatriate soccer players in Canada
Chicago Fire FC draft picks
USL League Two players
Major League Soccer players
United States men's under-23 international soccer players
United States men's international soccer players